, also titled Flowers Have Fallen and The Blossoms Have Fallen, is a 1938 Japanese drama film directed by Tamizo Ishida, based on a play by Kaoru Morimoto.

Plot
Set within a Kyoto geisha house against the backdrop of the 1864 Kinmon incident, the film follows the lives and relationships of the women who work there, while battles rage in the streets outside as rebel factions attempt to restore the emperor's reign. Akira, daughter of the house's madam Tomi, hopes to escape her milieu with the help of a young samurai rebel whom she met. After the women witness a killing at their front door, Tomi is taken away for an interrogation by the shogunate's secret police and does not return. In the end, the women leave the house, with only Akira left behind, who realises that she may never see her mother and her lover again.

Cast
 Ranko Hanai as Akira
 Reiko Minakami as Tanehachi
 Rikie Sanjō as Tomi, Akira's mother
 Kimiko Hayashi as Miyako
 Rumi Ejima as Harue
 Fujiko Naruse as Oshige
 Chieko Ishii as Shimewaka
 Ginko Ii as Okiyo
 Ryōko Satomi as Michiyo
 Reiko Sanjō as Otoyo
 Hisako Fujita as Hinako
 Kayoko Minakami as Kochō
 Teruko Hamada as Mitsuyū
 Mitsuko Sakai as Satogiku
 Shigeko Shijin as Ochobo
 Ryōko Hamaji as Abohan
 Setsuko Horikoshi as Kichiya
 Ayako Ichinose as Matsuba

Production
Morimoto's play had originally been written for and performed by the Bungakuza theatre troupe. The films consists of an entirely female cast, showing no male characters at all; also, all scenes are filmed solely within the geisha house, and not one single shot in the film is repeated.

Reception and legacy
In his 1979 book To the Distant Observer: Form and Meaning in the Japanese Cinema, film historian Nöel Burch rated Fallen Blossoms as "one of the most remarkable community portraits ever filmed", and Alexander Jacoby (in A Critical Handbook of Japanese Film Directors: From the Silent Era to the Present Day, 2008) titled the film the "acknowledged masterpiece" of its director. The British Film Institute included Fallen Blossoms in its 2020 The best Japanese film of every year – from 1925 to now list.

A print of the film is preserved at the National Film Archive of Japan.

References

External links
 

1938 films
Japanese black-and-white films
Japanese-language films
Japanese drama films
1930s Japanese films
Toho films
Films set in feudal Japan